Sanjay Nirupam (born 6 February 1965) is a former member of the Indian Parliament from Indian National Congress party, and former President of the Mumbai Regional Congress Committee. Nirupam served two terms as an MP in the Rajya Sabha first as a member from the Shiv Sena and then from the Congress Party. He represented North Mumbai Lok Sabha constituency from 2009 to 2014.

career

He was a member of Parliamentary Committees such as the Public Accounts Committee (PAC) and Finance Committee. He opened the 2013–14 budget debate for Congress Party in Parliament. He was Secretary of the AICC and was also Secretary-in-Charge of the state of Bihar. He is one of the National spokespersons of the Congress Party to express the Party's view on different issues on TV Channels. Sanjay Nirupam lost to BJP candidate Gopal Shetty in the 2014 Lok Sabha elections. He was appointed as President of Mumbai Regional Congress Committee in 2015. He was a contestant in Bigg Boss in 2008.

Career

After working at Jan Satta for around five years, he joined the Shiv Sena's Dopahar Ka Saamna.

After another poor showing at the polls, this time, the BMC elections in 2017, Nirupam tendered in his resignation as the head of the Congress Party for Mumbai.

References

External links
Official biographical sketch in Parliament of India website
"Mumbai North MP Sanjay Nirupam has a decent fund utilisation of 82 per cent" – Indian Express Tue 28 June 2011, 00:42 hrs
"www.sanjaynirupam.com"*"Ph.D.Awardees"

1965 births
Living people
People from Bihar
Rajya Sabha members from Maharashtra
India MPs 2009–2014
People from Rohtas District
Lok Sabha members from Maharashtra
Indian National Congress politicians
Shiv Sena politicians
Bigg Boss (Hindi TV series) contestants